Chalachithram was a weekly film magazine published in Malayalam language from Kerala, India. The publisher was Manorajyam. M.M. Balachandran served as the editor of the magazine. It was printed at Thiruvananthapuram and distributed throughout Kerala. It was one of the most popular film magazines of 1980's in Kerala. It highlighted the doings and happenings of the Mollywood film scene as well as update from Tamil and Hindi industry. But the publishers discontinued the printing in late 1980s.

References

External links

Defunct magazines published in India
Film magazines published in India
Weekly magazines published in India
Magazines with year of establishment missing
Magazines with year of disestablishment missing
Malayalam-language magazines
Mass media in Kerala